"I Just Wanna" is a song by American hip hop recording artist 50 Cent, released on March 26, 2012, as the second single from his tenth mixtape The Big 10, released on December 9, 2011. The song features vocals from 50 Cent's fellow G-Unit member Tony Yayo and was produced by D.R.U.G.S Beats.

Background
The single was announced on February 23, 2012, with the cover. The song on the mixtape starts with a sexual thirty-six-second intro and samples "That's the Way (I Like It)" performed by KC and the Sunshine Band. The intro and the sample was cut from the single version.

Music video
The video for the single was released on December 12, 2011, via his YouTube account and featured cameos appearances from Tony Yayo. 50 Cent also shown his new headphones line of SMS Audio on the video. It was directed by Jackson Smith, who also directed all the videos of the mixtape, except "Niggas Be Schemin'".

The music video has received over 4 million views on YouTube.

Track listing

Credits and personnel
Songwriter – Curtis Jackson, Marvin Bernard, Dorian Norman, Harry Wayne Casey, Richard Finch
Production – D.R.U.G.S Beats

Charts

Radio and release history

References

External links
 

2011 songs
2012 singles
50 Cent songs
Tony Yayo songs
Shady Records singles
Songs written by 50 Cent
Interscope Records singles
Songs written by Tony Yayo
Aftermath Entertainment singles